"Boys Night Out" is a song by American rock singer Timothy B. Schmit, released as the first single from his second solo studio album, Timothy B (1987). Schmit's best-selling single, it peaked at No. 25 on the US Billboard Hot 100 chart and at No. 17 on the Billboard Album Rock Tracks chart.

Charts

References

External links
 

Timothy B. Schmit songs
MCA Records singles
1987 singles
1987 songs
Songs with lyrics by Will Jennings
Songs written by Bruce Gaitsch